The Yun Hsien Resort is a resort in Wulai District, New Taipei, Taiwan.

History
The resort was originally opened on 6 August 1967 and constructed as the first theme park in Taiwan.

Architecture
The resort features a zoo and theme park.

Transportation

The resort is accessible by bus from Taipei Main Station or Xindian Station to the foot of a mountain, the followed by cable car for a length of 382 meters.

See also
 List of tourist attractions in Taiwan

References

External links
 

1967 establishments in Taiwan
Resorts in Taiwan
Tourist attractions in New Taipei
Wulai District